The Honounorable John Murdoch Mitchison FRS, FRSE (11 June 1922, Oxford – 17 March 2011, Edinburgh) was a British zoologist.

Background

Family
Mitchison was the son of the Labour politician Dick Mitchison and his wife, the writer Naomi (née Haldane). The biologist J.B.S. Haldane was his uncle, and the physiologist John Scott Haldane was his maternal grandfather. His elder brother is the bacteriologist Denis Mitchison, and his younger brother is the zoologist Avrion Mitchison. His wife was the historian Rosalind Mitchison.

Education
Mitchison went to Winchester College and Trinity College, Cambridge, later becoming Professor of Zoology at Edinburgh University in 1963 after working there for a decade. He was elected a fellow of the Royal Society of London in 1978.

Career
Considered a pioneer in the area of cellular biology, Mitchison developed the yeast Schizosaccharomyces pombe as a model system to study the mechanisms and kinetics of growth and the cell cycle. He was an academic advisor to the 2001 Nobel Prize in Physiology recipient Paul Nurse.

References

1922 births
2011 deaths
Academics of the University of Edinburgh
Alumni of Trinity College, Cambridge
Fellows of the Royal Society
Fellows of the Royal Society of Edinburgh
People educated at Winchester College
Scottish biologists
Younger sons of barons